Narayana Health (formerly known as Narayana Hrudyalaya) is an Indian chain of multi-speciality hospitals, heart centres, and primary care facilities with its headquarters in Bengaluru, India. It was founded by Dr. Devi Shetty in the year 2000.

Narayana Health has its presence across major Indian cities Bangalore, Delhi, Gurugram, Kolkata, Ahmedabad, Raipur, Jaipur, Mumbai, Mysore etc. with an international subsidiary in the Cayman Islands. The facilities offer medical care in over 30 medical specialities and three of its hospitals – Narayana Institute of Cardiac Sciences, Bangalore, and Health City Cayman Islands – are JCI (Joint Commission International) accredited.

History
Dr. Devi Shetty founded Narayana Hrudalaya (NH) in the year 2000 with a 280-bed heart hospital in Bangalore.

In 2013, Narayana Hrudyalaya officially changed its identity to Narayana Health. It now operates several hospitals and heart centres across India, making it the second largest hospital network in India (based on operational bed count). Since 2014, the group operates Health City Cayman Islands in Grand Caymen. Dr. Emmanuel Rupert was made the MD & Group CEO in the place of Dr. Ashutosh Raghuvansha following the latter's resignation in January 2019. The company has built a track record of providing good quality services at an affordable cost, especially in cardiology. From 2016 onwards, NH has increased its presence in New Delhi, Gurugram and Mumbai, by opening premium multi speciality hospitals, in order to boost margins. In 2022, NH announced that it is looking to set up a 1000-bed advanced speciality hospital in Kolkata, West Bengal.

Listing
Narayana Hrudyalaya was listed on the BSE and the NSE on 6 January 2016. Upon debut, the company was valued at over US$1 billion.

Current facilities

India

North India

 Shri Mata Vaishno Devi Narayana Super Speciality Hospital, Jammu, J&K
 Narayana Superspeciality Hospital, Gurugram
 Dharamshila Cancer Hospital and Research Centre Delhi

West India

 Narayana Multispeciality Hospital, Ahmedabad
 Narayana Multispeciality Hospital, Jaipur
 SRCC Children's Hospital, Mumbai

South India

 Mazumdar Shaw Medical Centre Bangalore
 MS Ramaiah Narayana Heart Centre, Bangalore
 Narayana Institute of Cardiac Sciences, Bangalore
 Narayana Medical Centre, Langford Town, Bangalore
 Narayana Multispeciality Clinic, Jayanagar, Bangalore
 Narayana Multispeciality Hospital, HSR Layout, Bangalore
 Narayana Multispeciality Hospital, Whitefield, Bangalore
 Narayana Multispeciality Hospital, Mysore
 NH Jindal Sanjeevani Multispeciality Hospital, Bellary
 RL Jalappa Narayana Heart Centre, Kolar
 Sahyadri Narayana Multispeciality Hospital, Shimoga
 SDM Narayana Heart Centre, Dharwad
 SS Narayana Heart Centre, Davengere

East India

 Brahmananda Narayana Multispeciality Hospital, Jamshedpur
 MMI Narayana Multispeciality Hospital, Raipur 
 Narayana Multispeciality Hospital, Barasat, Kolkata
 Narayana Multispeciality Hospital, Howrah
 Narayana Superspeciality Hospital, Guwahati
 Narayana Superspeciality Hospital, Howrah
 Rabindranath Tagore International Institute of Cardiac Sciences, Kolkata
 Rabindranath Tagore Surgical Centre, Kolkata

Cayman Islands 

 Health City Cayman Islands, Cayman Islands

See also
Dr. Devi Shetty

References

External links 
 
 Official Blog

 
Hospitals established in 2000
Hospitals in Bangalore
Hospital networks in India
Hospitals in Kolkata
Hospitals in Hyderabad, India
Hospitals in Rajasthan
Companies based in Bangalore
Health care companies of India
Health in the Cayman Islands
2000 establishments in Karnataka
Indian companies established in 2000
Companies listed on the National Stock Exchange of India
Companies listed on the Bombay Stock Exchange